Ploshtad  was a weekly newspaper in Kumanovo, Macedonia (present-day North Macedonia) that started to work since 2013. Newspaper editor was Marjan Petrushevski. The newspaper price was 20 MKD.

References

Newspapers published in North Macedonia
Macedonian-language newspapers
Mass media in Kumanovo